Devin Renee DeVasquez (born June 25, 1963) is an American model and actress. She was chosen as Playboys Playmate of the Month in June 1985, after being featured in the October 1981 issue's college pictorial. Her centerfold was photographed by Richard Fegley. Her father was from Mexico and her mother is of Irish descent.

She appeared in Can't Buy Me Love with Patrick Dempsey and went on to star in Society with Billy Warlock. DeVasquez has appeared in over 100 commercials and authored the book The Naked Truth About a Pinup Model,  which is about pin-up modeling and includes an interview with Bettie Page.

To help those who were affected by Hurricane Katrina, DeVasquez created Devin's Kickass Cajun Seasoning and offered it through her business, DevRonn Enterprises.

Career 
DeVasquez won $100,000 on the television talent show Star Search in 1986, and this win led to her being one of the first Hispanic playmates featured on the cover of the November 1986 Playboy. DeVasquez went on to an acting career. She played the virgin in House 2, had a supporting role in the high school film Can't Buy Me Love, and played Clarissa Carlyn in the thriller Society. In 1989, DeVasquez guest starred in "Her Cups Runneth Over", a third-season episode of the Fox series Married... with Children. She also appeared in the films A Low Down Dirty Shame, Busted, and Guns.

DeVasquez authored the books The Naked Truth About a Pinup Model, True Age, Timeless Beauty, My Husband's a Dog, My Wife's a Bitch, and The Day It Snowed in April.

DeVasquez writes for various magazines for Westlake magazine, Splash magazine and Primo magazine for Belgium. She is an active blogger for her website womantowoman.tv and devronnsblog.com, which chronicles her life and travels.

DeVasquez garnered four Daytime Emmy Award nominations as a producer on the Amazon Prime series, The Bay.

Personal life 
Devin dated rock star Prince in 1985 and Sylvester Stallone in 1988 before she married actor and musician Ronn Moss on September 25, 2009.

References

External links 

 
 DevRonn Enterprises
 
 

1963 births
Living people
Actresses from Baton Rouge, Louisiana
1980s Playboy Playmates
American people of Spanish descent
Hispanic and Latino American people
American people of Irish descent
American bloggers
American women bloggers

21st-century American women